Liliana Popescu, née Barbulescu (born 5 February 1982) is a Romanian middle distance runner, who specializes in the 800 metres.

Career
Her personal best is 1:59.34 minutes, achieved in May 2008 in Bucharest. She has 4:00.35 minutes in the 1500 metres, also achieved in May 2008 in Bucharest. She was removed from the Olympic squad prior to the 2008 Summer Olympics, as she failed a doping test for Erythropoietin (EPO) in May. She received a two-year ban from the sport from May 2008 to May 2010.

Popescu ran in the series of the 1500 m at the 2010 European Athletics Championships, but did not finish the race.

Achievements

References

1982 births
Living people
Doping cases in athletics
Romanian female middle-distance runners
Romanian sportspeople in doping cases
Universiade medalists in athletics (track and field)
Universiade gold medalists for Romania
Medalists at the 2003 Summer Universiade